The 1976 All-Pro Team is composed of the National Football League players that were named to the Associated Press, Newspaper Enterprise Association, Pro Football Writers Association, and Pro Football Weekly All-Pro Teams in 1976. Both first- and second- teams are listed for the AP, NEA, and PFWA  teams. These are the four All-Pro teams that are included in the Total Football II: The Official Encyclopedia of the National Football League and compose the Consensus All-pro team for 1976.

Teams

Key
 AP = Associated Press first-team All-Pro
 AP-2 = Associated Press second-team All-Pro
 NEA = Newspaper Enterprise Association first-team All-Pro team
 NEA-2 = Newspaper Enterprise Association second-team All-Pro team
 PFW = Pro Football Weekly All-Pro team
 PFWA = Pro Football Writers Association All-NFL

References
Pro-Football-Reference.com

All-Pro Teams
Allpro